Umbilicaria vellea is a species of lichen in the genus Umbilicaria.  It is sometimes called navel lichen.  It is found in North America and Europe in alpine and arctic habitats.  It is similar to the species Umbilicaria americana, which has a more southern distribution.

In Iceland, it is found at only one location and is listed as an endangered species (EN).

References

vellea
Lichen species
Lichens of Europe
Lichens of Subarctic America
Taxa named by Carl Linnaeus
Lichens described in 1753
Lichens of the Arctic